Cowbell Hollow (also known as Cowbell Hollow Run) is a tributary of White Deer Creek in Union County, Pennsylvania, in the United States. The stream is not designated as an impaired waterbody. Wild trout naturally reproduce within it throughout its length.

Course
Cowbell Hollow begins in a valley on the southeastern edge of a mountain in West Buffalo Township. It flows east-northeast for several tenths of a mile before arriving at the bottom of the mountain and reaching its confluence with White Deer Creek.

Hydrology
Cowbell Hollow is not designated as an impaired waterbody.

Geography and geology

Watershed
The stream's valley is entirely within the United States Geological Survey quadrangle of Williamsport SE. The mouth of the stream is situated within  of McKean Springs. The stream is in the Lower West Branch Susquehanna River drainage basin.

The designated use for Cowbell Hollow is aquatic life.

History
The valley of Cowbell Hollow was entered into the Geographic Names Information System on August 2, 1979. Its identifier in the Geographic Names Information System is 1172555. The stream is an unnamed stream that take the name of the named hollow through which it flows.

Cowbell Hollow is also known as Cowbell Hollow Run.

Biology
Two black bears were once shot in the valley of Cowbell Hollow in the 1800s or early 1900s. Wild trout naturally reproduce in Cowbell Hollow from its headwaters downstream to its mouth. They have been recorded doing so since at least 2003.

See also
Sand Spring Run, next tributary of White Deer Creek going downstream
Tunis Run, next tributary of White Deer Creek going upstream
List of rivers of Pennsylvania

References

Rivers of Union County, Pennsylvania
Tributaries of White Deer Creek
Rivers of Pennsylvania